Dhruba Das (born 4 February 1919, date of death unknown) was an Indian cricketer. He played eleven first-class matches for Bengal between 1941 and 1953. Das is deceased.

See also
 List of Bengal cricketers

References

External links
 

1919 births
Year of death missing
Indian cricketers
Bengal cricketers
People from Darjeeling